{{Automatic taxobox
| image = Coenaculum bangkaensis (MNHN-IM-2000-35094).jpeg
| image_caption = Shell of Coenaculum bangkaense (holotype at MNHN, Paris)
| display_parents = 3
| taxon = Coenaculum (gastropod)
| authority = Iredale, 1924
| type_species = Scala minutula | type_species_authority = Tate & May, 1900
| synonyms = *Graphis (Coenaculum) Iredale, 1924
| synonyms_ref = 
}}Coenaculum is a genus of medium-sized sea snails, marine gastropod molluscs in the family Cimidae.

Species
The species within this genus include:
 Coenaculum bangkaense  Cecalupo & Perugia, 2020
 Coenaculum minutulum (Tate & May, 1900)
 Coenaculum secundum (Powell, 1937)
 Coenaculum tertium (Dell, 1952)
 Coenaculum weerdtae (Moolenbeek & Faber, 1992)

References

External links
 Iredale, T. (1924). Results from Roy Bell's molluscan collections. Proceedings of the Linnean Society of New South Wales. 49: 179-278

Cimidae